Mosfileri is a small village in the Nicosia District of Cyprus, just east of the Kokkina exclave. It is part of the Pigenia municipality. It is also known as Mosfili.

Communities in Nicosia District